Isthmohyla tica, also known as Starrett's treefrog, is a species of frog in the family Hylidae. It is found in the Cordillera de Tilarán, Cordillera Central, and Cordillera de Talamanca of Costa Rica and western Panama. The specific name tica is derived from the name that Costa Ricans use to refer themselves, tico.

Description
Adult males measure  and adult females  in snout–vent length. The snout is rounded in profile. The tympanum is visible. Supratympanic fold is present. The fingers are up to 1/3 webbed and bear terminal discs. The toes are about 4/5 webbed and bear discs similar to the finger ones. The dorsum is mottled with shades of green and brown. There are often some bright green flecks present too. The flanks are usually brown mottled or blotched with yellow. The upper arm is brown or orangeish. The upper surfaces of the limbs bear dark bars. The ventral surface is a dingy white.

The tadpoles have small, somewhat flattened body and a very long tail with low fins. They have a large oral disc that can be used adhere to rocks in fast-flowing streams.

Habitat and conservation
They are nocturnal. The eggs are deposited under rocks in streams where the tadpoles then develop.

Many populations of this species have disappeared (but sometimes rediscovered later) or collapsed. The exact cause of these large declines is unknown, but may involve some combination of chytridiomycosis and climate change. The species is also negatively affected by habitat loss. It has been recorded in a number of protected areas.

References

tica
Amphibians of Costa Rica
Amphibians of Panama
Amphibians described in 1966
Taxonomy articles created by Polbot